The 1925 New Mexico A&M Aggies football team was an American football team that represented New Mexico College of Agriculture and Mechanical Arts (now known as New Mexico State University) during the 1925 college football season.  In their third year under head coach R. R. Brown, the Aggies compiled a 5–3–1 record and shut out four opponents. The team played its home games on Miller Field, sometimes also referred to as College Field.

Schedule

References

New Mexico AandM
New Mexico State Aggies football seasons
New Mexico AandM Aggies football